Ban Sai Thong is a Thai romantic novel written by Ko Surangkhanang. First published as a serial in Piyamit magazine in 1950, it became one of the most popular novels of the time. Telling the story of Photchaman, a commoner girl who's sent to live with her aunt's condescending noble family, the novel has been adapted into four plays, six television soap operas, and two films.

References

Thai novels
1950 novels
Thai romance novels